The 1994–95 Gonzaga Bulldogs men's basketball team represented Gonzaga University in the West Coast Conference (WCC) during the 1994–95 NCAA Division I men's basketball season. Led by thirteenth-year head coach Dan Fitzgerald, the Bulldogs were  overall in the regular season (7–7 in WCC, fourth), and played their home games on campus at the Charlotte Y. Martin Centre in Spokane, Washington.

The Bulldogs opened the season with just one loss in twelve non-conference games, but dropped their first six games in conference. In the next eight WCC games, they lost only once, and finished fourth in the standings.

Gonzaga advanced to the final of the WCC tournament at Santa Clara, and defeated second-seed Portland to secure their first-ever appearance in the NCAA tournament.

Ten days later in the West regional, the Bulldogs lost to tenth-ranked Maryland in Salt Lake City to finish at  Their next appearance in the tournament came four years later.

Postseason results

|-
!colspan=6 style=| WCC Tournament

|-
!colspan=6 style=| NCAA tournament

References

External links
Sports Reference – Gonzaga Bulldogs men's basketball – 1994–95 season

Gonzaga Bulldogs men's basketball seasons
Gonzaga
Gonzaga
1994 in sports in Washington (state)
1995 in sports in Washington (state)